Gladstone is a village in Henderson County, Illinois, United States. The population was 281 at the 2010 census, down from 284 in 2000. It is part of the Burlington, IA–IL Micropolitan Statistical Area.

Geography
Gladstone is located in west-central Henderson County at  (40.864568, -90.958815). Illinois Route 164 passes through the village, leading north  to Oquawka, the county seat, and south  to U.S. Route 34.

History
Gladstone grew from a Meskwaki village that was led by Taimah in the 1820s. Gladstone was originally named "Sagetown", after Gideon Sage upon whose land the town was platted. Gladstone is named after the English statesman William Ewart Gladstone.

Demographics

As of the census of 2000, there were 284 people, 139 households, and 82 families residing in the village. The racial makeup of the village was 99.30% White, 0.35% African American, and 0.35% from two or more races. Hispanic or Latino of any race were 0.35% of the population.

There were 139 households, out of which 25.2% had children under the age of 18 living with them, 46.0% were married couples living together, 10.1% had a female householder with no husband present, and 40.3% were non-families. 36.7% of all households were made up of individuals, and 19.4% had someone living alone who was 65 years of age or older.  The average household size was 2.04 and the average family size was 2.64.

In the village, the population was spread out, with 20.8% under the age of 18, 5.6% from 18 to 24, 27.8% from 25 to 44, 27.5% from 45 to 64, and 18.3% who were 65 years of age or older.  The median age was 42 years. For every 100 females, there were 94.5 males.  For every 100 females age 18 and over, there were 94.0 males.

The median income for a household in the village was $30,694, and the median income for a family was $41,429. Males had a median income of $32,083 versus $20,972 for females. The per capita income for the village was $16,245.  About 11.5% of families and 10.5% of the population were below the poverty line, including 1.8% of those under the age of eighteen and 23.1% of those 65 or over.

References

Villages in Henderson County, Illinois
Villages in Illinois
Burlington, Iowa micropolitan area